Lalpur Jam railway station  is a railway station serving in Jamnagar district of Gujarat state of India. It is under Bhavnagar railway division of Western Railway zone of Indian Railways. Passenger, Express, and Superfast trains halt here.

Trains 

The following trains halt at Lalpur Jam railway station in both directions:

 19015/16 Porbandar–Mumbai Central Saurashtra Express
 12905/06 Howrah–Porbandar Express
 19263/64 Porbandar–Delhi Sarai Rohilla Express

References

Railway stations in Jamnagar district
Bhavnagar railway division